Jaishankar Prasad (30 January 1889 15 November 1937) was a prominent figure in modern Hindi literature as well as Hindi theatre. Prasad was his pen name. He was also known as Chhayavadi poet.

Poetic style

Prasad started writing poetry with the pen name of ‘Kaladhar’. The first collection of poem that Jai Shankar Prasad penned, named, Chitradhar, was written in Braj dialect of Hindi but his later works were written in Khadi dialect or Sanskritized Hindi.

Later on Prasad promulgated ‘Chhayavad’, a literary trend in Hindi literature.

He is considered one of the Four Pillars (Char Stambh) of Romanticism in Hindi Literature (Chhayavad), along with Sumitranandan Pant, Mahadevi Verma, and Suryakant Tripathi 'Nirala'.

His vocabulary avoids the Persian element of Hindi and mainly consists of Sanskrit (Tatsama) words and words derived from Sanskrit (Tadbhava words). The subject of his poetry spans the entire horizon of subjects of his era, from romantic to nationalistic.

Dramas and other writings
His dramas are considered to be most pioneering ones in Hindi. Prasad's most famous dramas include Skandagupta,Chandragupta and Dhruvaswamini .
Many childrens like him as he gives us a knowledge about Ancient times.

The majority of them revolve around historical stories of Ancient India. Some of them were also based on mythological plots.

In 1960s, Shanta Gandhi Professor of Ancient Indian Drama while at National School of Drama, revived interest in Jaishankar Prasad's plays for modern Indian theatre, by successfully staging his most important play Skanda Gupta written in 1928, with little changes to the original script.

Major works

Poetry
 Kānan kusum (The Forest Flower)(1913)
 Mahārānā kā mahatv (The Maharana's greatness)(1914)
 Jharnā (The Waterfall)(1918)
 Ānsū (The tear)(1925)
 Lahar (The wave)(1933)
 Kāmāyanī (an epic about Manu and the flood)(1935/36)
 Prem pathik (The Love Wanderer)(1914)
 Aatmkathya (Autobiography)

Drama
 Ek Ghoont (A sip)
 Skandagupta (On Emperor Skandagupta)
 Chandragupta (On Emperor Chandragupta Maurya)
 Dhruvasvāminī
 Rajyashrī (Royal Bliss)
 Ajatashatru
 Janmejay ka Naag-Yagy

Story collections
 Aandhī
 Pratidhvani (The Echo)
 Akashdeep (Internal Lamp)
 Indrajāl (Hypnosis)
 Sandeh (Doubt)
 Daasi (Maid)
 Chitra Mandir

Novels
 Kankal (The Skeleton)
 Titli (The Butterfly)
 Iravati ( not completed)

Poetic drama 

 Karunalay

Legacy

Neo-romanticism in Hindi Literature
Jaishankar Prasad's Kamayani (Hindi: कामायनी) (1936), a Hindi classic poem is considered as an important magnum opus of this school. The poem belongs to the Chhayavadi school of Hindi poetry.

Critical reception 
In her glowing tribute to Jai Shankar Prasad, the poet- critic Mahadevi Verma said:

"Whenever I remember our great poet, Prasad a particular image comes to my mind. A fir tree stands on the slope of the Himalaya, straight and tall as the proud mountain peaks themselves. Its lofty head braves the assaults of the snow, the rain, and the blazing heat of the sun. Violent storms shake its spreading branches, while a thin stream of water plays hide-and-seek amongst its root. Even under the most heavy snowfall, the most fierce heat, and the torrential rain, the fir tree holds its head high. Even in the midst of the worst thunderstorm and blizzards, it remains steady and unflinching.”

Regarding his influence in Indian literature, the late scholar David Rubin wrote in The Return of Sarasvati (Oxford, 1993):- "To Jayshankar Prasad belongs the credit of making the first successful leap forward in the development of a genuine poetic art in khari boli Hindi and giving it, in Ansu, its first masterpiece." Rubin felt his lyrics regarding nature and human love helped to define the Chhayavad movement, and that his reflective nature and deep love of reading and music heavily influenced his work.

See also
 List of Indian writers

References

Sources
 
 http://www.jaishankarprasad.com/biography/

External links
 

1889 births
1937 deaths
Hindi-language writers
Hindi-language poets
Indian male novelists
Writers from Varanasi
Hindi dramatists and playwrights
20th-century Indian novelists
20th-century Indian dramatists and playwrights
Novelists from Uttar Pradesh
Indian male dramatists and playwrights
Poets from Uttar Pradesh
20th-century Indian poets
Dramatists and playwrights from Uttar Pradesh
20th-century Indian male writers